The Aztec chub (Aztecula sallaei) is a cyprinid fish endemic to Mexico. It is the only species in its genus.

References

Leuciscinae

Freshwater fish of Mexico
Fish described in 1868
Taxa named by Albert Günther